Bodzanów  is a city in Płock County, Masovian Voivodeship, in east-central Poland.

The village has a population of 1,300.

References

External links
 Jewish Community in Bodzanów on Virtual Shtetl

Villages in Płock County